Benz Antoine (born June 22, 1972) is a Haitian-Canadian actor who has made over 100 film and television appearances.

Early life and education
Benz Antoine was born in 1972 in Montreal, Canada and is the oldest of the three children raised by his mother, Rose Marie. After graduating from high school, Benz enrolled at Concordia University.

Career
Antoine has made over 100 film and television appearances. Antoine has provided the voice of the Haitian character Baptiste in Overwatch. He is best known for his appearances in Romeo Must Die, Death Race, Get Rich or Die Tryin', Four Brothers, and I'm Not There. He also earned critical acclaim for his gripping portrayal of alcoholic cop Tyler Joseph in both the original French version and the English adaptation of 19-2.

Filmography

Film

Television

References

External links
Benz Antoine on Twitter

Living people
1972 births
Male actors from Montreal
Black Canadian male actors
Canadian people of Haitian descent
Canadian male film actors
Canadian male television actors
Canadian male voice actors